Unen Bahlam (fl. c. 317) was queen of the Maya city-state of Tikal. Although generally assumed to be female, the sex of this ruler is unclear.

Notes

Footnotes

References

Rulers of Tikal
4th century in the Maya civilization
4th-century monarchs in North America
4th-century women rulers
4th-century deaths